Aberdeen F.C. competed in the Scottish Premier Division, Scottish Cup, League Cup and European Champions' Cup in season 1985–86.

Overview

Aberdeen finished fourth in the Scottish Premier Division and won the Scottish Cup and Scottish League Cup. In Europe, they reached the quarter finals of the Champions' Cup but lost out to IFK Gothenburg on the away goals rule.

Frank McDougall finished the season as Aberdeen's top scorer with 14 goals in the league and 20 overall, including all four goals in a 4–1 win over Celtic in November.

Results

Scottish Premier Division

Final standings

Scottish League Cup

Scottish Cup

European Champions' Cup

Squad

Appearances & Goals

|}

References

 

Aberdeen F.C. seasons
Aberdeen